Florence Municipal Airport , is a public airport located in the city of Florence in Lane County, Oregon, United States. It is mostly used for general aviation.

Facilities and aircraft
Florence Municipal Airport contains one asphalt paved runway, 15/33, which measures 3000 x 60 ft (914.4 x 18.3 m). There is no air traffic control tower located on the airfield.

There are 13 aircraft based on the field. 11 single-engines and 2 multi-engine aircraft.

The airport has an average of 134 flights a week. This includes 70% general aviation, 21% military and 9% air taxi.

Cargo carriers

References

External links
Florence Municipal Airport Website

Airports in Lane County, Oregon